Carpodetus serratus is an evergreen tree with small ovate or round, mottled leaves with a toothy margin, and young twigs grow zig-zag, and fragrant white flowers in 5 cm panicles and later black chewy berries. It is an endemic of New Zealand. Its most common name is putaputāwētā which means many wētā emerge - referring to the nocturnal Orthoptera that live in holes in the trunk of this tree made by Pūriri moth caterpillars. Regional variations on the name also refer to this insect that lives and feeds on it such as kaiwētā, and punawētā. The tree is also sometimes called marbleleaf. It is found in broadleaf forest in both North, South and Stewart Islands. It flowers between November and March, and fruits are ripe from January to February.

Description
Putaputāwētā is small tree of up to 10 m in height. It develops a slender trunk of up to 30 cm in diameter, which is covered by rough and corky bark, has a mottled grey-white colouring and is often knobbly due to boring by insects. Juvenile branches have an obvious zig-zag orientation, which becomes less distinctive when older. There are clearly visible lenticels. The leaf stems are about 1 cm. The leaf blades are thin to slightly leathery, broad-elliptic, often widest near the base, or almost round, 4-6 × 2–3 cm when fully grown, dark green near the larger veins and yellowish green removed from the veins. They have a rounded, sometimes somewhat unequal foot, a serrated toothed margin and a pointed or blunt tip. The stems of the leaves, inflorescences and flowers are covered in felty hairs. The inflorescences are panicles of 5 cm in diameter and consist of up to fifteen or more flowers at the leaf axil or at the end of branches. Individual flowers are 5–6 mm, mostly pentamerous but possibly occasionally trimerous. The calyx lobes are approximately 1 mm long, narrowly triangular. The petals are white, triangular, 3-4 × 2–3 mm. Stamens are alternating with the petals and have short filaments. The anthers are connected to the filaments at their base, open in lengthwise slits towards the inside, through which the yellow pollen is shed in tetrads. The stigma is bud-shaped, with a dark bluish purple top. The pistil is shed after the petals and anthers. The fruit is a somewhat fleshy round berry of 4–6 mm that turns black when it ripens, the lower half is cupped by the remains of calyx. The berry contains many seeds in three to five compartments, each seed 1–2 mm long with a netted outer skin.

Taxonomy
Carpodetus and its type species C. serratus were first described by father and son Forster in 1773 and placed in the Saxifragaceae. In 1934 it was assigned to the newly created Escalloniaceae by Hutchinson in his major revision of the dicotyledon families. In the APG III system, Carpodetus has been referred to the Rousseaceae.

Etymology
Carpodetus is derived from the Greek words καρπός (karpos) 'fruit' and detus (bound together), a reference that the seeds are bound together in clusters in the berry. The species epithet serratus is Latin and means shaped like a saw, from serra (saw). 
The Māori name  refers to the fact that  often shelter in old burrows of pūriri caterpillars. The fact that freshly cut wood contains so much sap that it is difficult to burn gave rise to the name bucket-of-water-tree.

Ecology

This tree prefers moist broadleaf forest and is locally common in Nothofagus-forest. It also frequently occurs in secondary forest, forest margins and along streams. The caterpillars of the pūriri moth (Aenetus virescens) feed on the cambium thus creating characteristic diamond-shaped feeding scars. The entrance of the burrow is hidden by a web spun by the caterpillar. Trees may be weakened by a high density of caterpillars, particularly if the trunks are still thin. The workers of Prolasius advenus (small brown bush ant) feed on the sap trickling from the wounds in the tree caused by the caterpillars. When the pūriri moth caterpillar has left the hole is used by tree wētā (Hemideina spp.) as a daytime refuge. At night the tree wētā eat the leaves and fruits of the tree - explaining why this species is called kaiwētā by Tūhoe iwi.

Cultivation
Marbleleaf adapts well to garden use and is widely cultivated in New Zealand. It remains a compact, rounded shrub for several years before finally developing its adult tree-like form. Marbleleaf may be trimmed to keep it compact and bushy. Well grown plants will flower heavily. As far as can be ascertained there are no commercially distributed Carpodetus serratus cultivars.

References

Trees of New Zealand
Plants described in 1773
Rousseaceae